Benjamin Oliver Kelly (born September 15, 1978) is a former American football cornerback of the National Football League, Arena Football League and Canadian Football League. He was drafted by the Miami Dolphins in the third round of the 2000 NFL Draft. He played college football at Colorado.

Kelly was also a member of the New England Patriots, Denver Broncos, Los Angeles Avengers, Calgary Stampeders and Grand Rapids Rampage. He earned a Super Bowl ring with the Patriots in Super Bowl XXXVI over the St. Louis Rams.

Kelly is well represented in the Aloha Bowl record books after he returned a kickoff for a TD against Oregon on Dec. 25, 1998.

References

1978 births
Living people
American football cornerbacks
American football return specialists
American players of Canadian football
Canadian football defensive backs
Calgary Stampeders players
Colorado Buffaloes football players
Denver Broncos players
Grand Rapids Rampage players
Los Angeles Avengers players
Miami Dolphins players
New England Patriots players
Players of American football from Cleveland
Players of Canadian football from Cleveland